Ljubav (trans. Love) is the debut studio album by the Serbian hard rock/heavy metal band Trigger, released in 2007. Ljubav is a concept album, featuring lyrics dealing with dark sides of love.

Track listing
All songs written by Dušan Svilokos Đurić
 "Igračka (Povedi me u Diznilend)" - 4:03
 "Više neće biti nas" - 4:05
 "Jedan dan" - 4:49
 "Inercija" - 5:11
 "Glas" - 4:21
 "Ti si potorošen" - 4:07
 "Dobar pas" - 4:01
 "U torbi od plastike" - 4;39
 "Ti od blata praviš me" - 4:30
 "Zaspala" - 5:11
 "Navika" - 2:58
 "Ljubav: Nisi me naučio da padnem" - 5:21
 "Ljubav: Pad" - 2:12

Personnel 
 Milena Branković - vocals, artwork
 Dušan Svilokos Đurić - guitar, programming, production, artwork
 Petar Popović - bass guitar
 Marko Antnonić - keyboards
 Zoran jović - drums

Additional personnel 
 Goran Šimpraga - production, mixing, mastering
 Vladimir Petrović - artwork, photography, design

References 

 Ljubav at Discogs

External links 
 Ljubav at Discogs

Trigger (band) albums
2007 debut albums
Concept albums
PGP-RTS albums